Franciscus Jacobus "Frans" Luitjes (21 June 1944 – 27 October 1965) was a Dutch sprinter. He competed at the 1964 Summer Olympics in the 100 m and 200 m events, but failed to reach the finals.

In 1964, Luitjes was selected the KNAU Athlete of the Year. He died in 1965, aged 21, as a result of neglected lymph node inflammation.

References

1944 births
1965 deaths
Athletes (track and field) at the 1964 Summer Olympics
Dutch male sprinters
Olympic athletes of the Netherlands
Sportspeople from Utrecht (city)